Charlier may refer to:

People
 Anna Charlier, fiancée of North pole explorer Nils Strindberg
 Carl Charlier (1862–1934), Swedish astronomer
 Cédric Charlier, Belgian field hockey player
 Guillaume Charlier (1854–1925), Belgian sculptor
 Henri Charlier (1883–1975), French painter and sculptor
 Jean-Joseph Charlier (1794–1886), Belgian artisan and revolutionary
 Jean-Michel Charlier (1924–1989), Belgian scriptwriter and comic book author
 Joseph Charlier (1816–1896), Belgian self-described jurist, writer, accountant and merchant
 Léopold Charlier (1867–1936), Belgian violinist and music teacher
 Olivier Charlier (born 1961), French violinist
 Philippe Charlier (born 1977), French coroner, forensic pathologist and paleopathologist
 Roger Charlier (1921–2018), Belgian Second World War resistance fighter, member of the prosecuting team at the Nuremberg trials and oceanographer

Other uses
 Charlier (lunar crater) named after Carl Charlier
 Charlier (Martian crater) named after Carl Charlier
 Charlier Museum, an art museum in Brussels, Belgium
 Charlier polynomials introduced by Carl Charlier

See also
 Charlier Cut, a method of cutting a deck of cards with one hand